Mount Anderson may refer to:
 Mount Anderson (Antarctica) in Antarctica
 Mount Anderson (Australia) in the Australian Alps
 Mount Anderson (Washington) in Washington

See also
Anderson Mountain
Anderson Peak (disambiguation)